The national symbols of Bosnia and Herzegovina are flags, icons or cultural expressions that are emblematic, representative or otherwise characteristic of Bosnia and Herzegovina or culture of nations in Bosnia and Herzegovina. As a rule, these symbols are cultural icons that have emerged from folklore and tradition of nations in Bosnia and Herzegovina, meaning few have any official status.

Flags

Heraldry

Anthem

Flora and fauna

Food and drink

People

Architecture

Other symbols

References